The 2021–22 Hobart Hurricanes season was the eleventh in the club's history. The team was coached by Adam Griffith and captained by Matthew Wade, they competed in the BBL's 2021–22 season.

Squad information

The current squad of the Hobart Hurricanes for the 2021–22 Big Bash League season as of 5 February 2021.
 Players with international caps are listed in bold.

Season results and standings

Points table

League stage

Playoffs

References

Hobart Hurricanes seasons
2021–22 Australian cricket season